Bagatsing is a Filipino surname of Indian origin (from Bhagat Singh). Notable people with the surname include:

Hyram Bagatsing (born 1985), Filipino basketball player
Ramon Bagatsing (1916–2006), Filipino politician
Ramon Bagatsing Jr. (born 1950), Filipino politician and diplomat
Raymond Bagatsing (born 1967), Filipino actor and model
RK Bagatsing (born 1980), Filipino actor and model

Indian surnames
Surnames of Indian origin